Hoseynabad-e Zandeh (also Romanized as Ḩoseynābād-e Zandeh; also known as Ḩoseynābād) is a village in Kharqan Rural District, Bastam District, Shahrud County, Semnan Province, Iran. At the 2006 census, its population was 455, in 129 families.

References 

Populated places in Shahrud County